Thomas Branch is a stream in Shelby County in the U.S. state of Missouri. It is a tributary of Tiger Fork.

Thomas Branch has the name of the original owner of the site.

See also
List of rivers of Missouri

References

Rivers of Shelby County, Missouri
Rivers of Missouri